was a town located in Haibara District, Shizuoka Prefecture, Japan. It is notable for its production of Shizuoka green tea.

As of July 1, 2005, the town had an estimated population of 6,236 and a density of 51.76 persons per km². The total area was 120.48 km².

On April 1, 2008, Kawane was merged into the expanded city of Shimada and thus no longer exists as an independent municipality.

Geography
There are a number of surrounding municipalities, including:

Aoi-ku, Shizuoka city
Tenryū-ku, Hamamatsu
Shimada
Fujieda
Kawanehon, Haibara District
Mori, Shuchi District

History
April 1, 1889 - "Shimokawane Village" founded from the merger of three pre-Meiji villages.
January 1, 1955 - Merged part of Ikumi Village in Shida District.
February 26, 1955 - Merged Sasama Village in Shida District.
April 1, 1955 - Shimokawane Village was reclassified as Kawane Town.
April 1, 2008 - Kawane Town was merged into Shimada City.

External links

 Shimada official website 

Populated places established in 1889
Populated places disestablished in 2008
2008 disestablishments in Japan
Dissolved municipalities of Shizuoka Prefecture
Shimada, Shizuoka